Mortimer (Tim) Louis Anson (1901 – 16 October 1968) was the protein chemist who  proposed that protein folding was a 
reversible, two-state reaction. He was the founding 
editor of Advances in Protein Chemistry.

Protein folding studies

Together with Alfred Mirsky, Anson was the first to propose 
that conformational protein folding was a reversible process.  He 
later proposed that it was essentially a two-state process, i.e., 
that the folded and unfolded states were well-defined thermodynamic
states separated by a large activation energy barrier.  He also
was the first to note that the energy barrier typical of folding
(5 kcal/mol, 20 kJ/lmol) was small compared to the absolute magnitudes of the 
energies and entropies involved (~100 kcal/mol, 400 kJ/mol) and, hence, 
proposed that energy and entropy were continuously traded off
during the folding process.

Anson moved to the Rockefeller Institute in 1927, where he remained
for fifteen years (1927–1942).  He worked closely with John H. Northrop.
In 1937, Anson first purified and crystallized carboxypeptidase A, a 
classic model system of protein science.

Advances in Protein Chemistry

In 1944 Anson was, with J. T. Edsall, the founding editor of Advances in Protein Chemistry, which remains one of the leading journals for reviewing the state
of biochemical problems.  Anson conceived the journal in long
discussions with Kurt Jacoby, who had fled Nazi Germany
and had once headed the Akademische Verlagsgesellschaft in 
Leipzig.

Nutritional research

Anson was haunted by the suffering caused in the underdeveloped 
world by poor nutrition, and in 1942, left a prestigious research
position at the Rockefeller Institute to investigate 
biochemical and genetic methods for improving the nutrition 
of foods, e.g., amino acid fortification.

Personal history

In 1945, Tim Anson married Nina Anton, who was active in the theater. Together, they had at least one daughter, Jill (Mrs. John Szarkowski). Nina Anson died of a heart attack in October 1963.  Tim Anson
died on 1 October 1968 of his third heart attack (the first two having been in early 1966 and the summer of 1968).

Anson was good friends with Béla Bartók, especially during Bartók's final years in America.

References

 Edsall JT. (1969) "Mortimer Louis Anson", Adv. Protein Chem., 24, vi-x.
 Anson ML and Mirsky AE. (1925) "On Some General Properties of Proteins", J. Gen. Physiol., 9, 169–179.
 Anson ML and Mirsky AE. (1929) "Protein Coagulation and Its Reversal: The Preparation of Completely Coagulated Hemoglobin", J. Gen. Physiol., 13, 121–132.
 Mirsky AE and Anson ML. (1929) "Protein Coagulation and Its Reversal: The Reversal of the Coagulation of Hemoglobin", J. Gen. Physiol., 13, 133–143.
 Anson ML (1938) "Section I. The Coagulation of Proteins", in The Chemistry of the Amino Acids and Proteins (Carl L. A. Schmidt, ed.), Charles C. Thomas Books.
 Anson ML. (1945) "Protein Denaturation and the Properties of Protein Groups", Adv. Protein. Chem., 2, 361–386.
 Anson ML. (1953) "The denaturation of proteins" in Les Proteines, Neuvième Conseil de Chimie, Institut International de Chimie Solvay, (R. Stoops, ed.), Brussels.

American biochemists
American molecular biologists
1901 births
1968 deaths